Chinwekene Isaac Udokporo is a Nigerian actress. She won the 2019 City People Movie Awards for Face of Igbo Movie of the year which was presented by City People Magazine.

Personal life
Chinwe Isaac was born in Owerri, Imo State. She celebrates her birthday every September 5 of each year.

Career
Isaac's acting career started in 2008, she became prominent when she was featured in the Nollywood movie One Last Feeling. However, she became more notable when she featured in the movie Isioma Scotland. Because of her role in this movie, she won an award as the Face of Igbo Movie of the year.

In a 2012 list compiled by Vanguard, Isaac was listed as one of top five hot Nollywood actresses in the film industry to watch out for.
Isaac declared her intention to quit acting to focus on  a new direction for her life.
Her decision to stop acting was because she wants to keep a happy marital home. she later featured in some movies.

Selected filmography
Uncomfortable Truth (2014)
Painted Lies (2014)
Isioma Scotland (2017)
A Taste of Grief (2019)

Accolades

References

External links 
https://m.imdb.com/name/nm6334451/

Nigerian film actresses
Lagos State University alumni
University of Nigeria alumni
Year of birth missing (living people)
Living people
Igbo actresses
People from Imo State
Nigerian film award winners